The pound was the currency of Southern Rhodesia from 1964 to 1965 and Rhodesia from 1965 until 1970. It was subdivided into 20 shillings, each of 12 pence.

History

The Rhodesian pound was introduced following the break-up of the Federation of Rhodesia and Nyasaland, when Southern Rhodesia changed its name to simply Rhodesia. The Rhodesian pound replaced the Rhodesia and Nyasaland pound at par and the coins and banknotes of this earlier currency continued to circulate.

Like its predecessor, the Rhodesian pound was initially pegged to sterling. When sterling was devalued from US$2.8 to US$2.4 in 1967, Rhodesia switched its peg to £1 Rhodesian = US$2.8. In 1970, the pound was replaced by the dollar, at a rate of £1 Rhodesian = $2 Rhodesian, so $1 Rhodesian was US$1.40.

Coins

In 1964, coins were introduced for 6d, 1/–, 2/– and 2/6. These coins also bore a denomination in cents (5c, 10c, 20c and 25c, respectively), although Rhodesia did not decimalise until 1970. This was possibly for compatibility with the South African rand, which retained a fixed 2:1 parity with the Rhodesian pound until 1967. In 1968, 3d coins were introduced which did not bear a denomination in cents. All coins had the title of Queen Elizabeth II in English, rather than in Latin, as had been the case on the coins of Rhodesia and Nyasaland and Southern Rhodesia.

Banknotes

Beginning in 1964, banknotes were issued in denominations of 10/–, £1 and £5. All notes featured Queen Elizabeth II on the obverse. The reverse designs were reused on the new dollar notes introduced on 17 February 1970. The Rhodesian dollar notes are similar to the earlier Rhodesian pound issues, but marked with the new currency units, the bank logo replaces the coat of arms, and the coat of arms replaces the portrait of Queen Elizabeth II.

Prior to UDI, Rhodesia was a member of the sterling zone. The banknotes were printed and supplied from the UK by the printers Bradbury Wilkinson. After UDI, the British government expelled Rhodesia from the sterling zone and the supply of banknotes dried up. This very soon had an adverse effect in Rhodesia, and the shortage of new notes and the condition of those in circulation began to become a pressing concern.

In early 1966, the Reserve Bank of Rhodesia ordered a completely new series of Rhodesian banknotes from the German printers Giesecke & Devrient in Munich. A court injunction prevented the banknotes from being despatched to Rhodesia, and the entire order was destroyed by the printers. Substitute consignments were printed in Rhodesia between 1966 and October 1968.

References

External links
Rhodesian Currency

Modern obsolete currencies
Currencies of Africa
Currencies of the Commonwealth of Nations
pound
1964 establishments in Southern Rhodesia
1970 disestablishments in Rhodesia